Mårten Karl Herman Stenberger (27 March 1898 – 19 January 1973) was a Swedish archaeologist, who from 1952 to 1965 served as professor of archaeology at Uppsala University. Before his professorship he took part in many excavations, including in Öland, in Gotland, and in Greenland.

Early life and education
Mårten Stenberger was born on 27 March 1898 in Göteborg, Sweden, to Karl Nilsson Stenberger, a merchant, and Beda Kristina Stenberger (née Eriksson). He obtained a master's degree in geography, geology, mineralogy and Scandinavian and comparative archaeology, though was most interested in geology. In 1933 he obtained a Ph.D.; his dissertation, entitled Oland under äldre järnåldern ("Oland during the Early Iron Age"), is considered to be the first one in Sweden with a clear architectural-archaeological orientation.

Career
Stenberger participated in numerous excavations throughout his career. Many summers were spent excavating Iron Age settlements in Öland, Sweden's second largest island, and in the 1930s he joined a Danish excavation to Greenland, where he dug out Viking Age houses. From 1934 onward, Stenberger spent his summers in Oland, and his winters lecturing in Uppsala. Further excavations from 1946 to 1950, of a town with stone houses, took place at Vallhagar (sv) in Gotland, and in 1955 he published a description of these in two extensive volumes.

From 1952 to 1965, following after Oscar Almgren and Sune Lindqvist, and coming before Bertil Almgren, Stenberger served as a professor of archaeology at Uppsala University.

Personal life
Mårten Stenberger died on 19 January 1973, in Stockholm County.

References

Bibliography

  
  

1898 births
1973 deaths
Swedish archaeologists
20th-century archaeologists
Members of the Royal Gustavus Adolphus Academy